Feras Bugnah (born September 29, 1987) is a Saudi Arabian filmmaker, video blogger and actor. His YouTube video series, called "Malob Aleyna", or "We Are Being Cheated", highlights social inequalities and political issues that the group of filmmakers feels are being overlooked by the Saudi government and specifically King Abdullah. He was reportedly arrested in 2011 for a particular episode of this series that exposed poverty in Riyadh. He is also known for a series called Malub Aleina/Malob Aleyna in which he educates viewers on the viewpoints of members of Saudi's lower classes.

Youmak Maai
The YouTube series "Youmak Maii", which translates to "Your Day With Me", highlights different social and economic viewpoints of Saudi society. All five characters in the show are played by Feras Bugnah. Each episode features Bugnah playing a different character, such as a street cleaner, blind man, and a street beggar.

Malob Aleyna
The video series "We Are Being Cheated" (also known as "Mal3ob3lena" online). The series began in the summer of 2011. In the series Feras Bugnah is seen on-camera, narrating the reports and interviewing subjects. The group hopes their videos will bring about change in systems they feel are poorly implemented.

Arrest and detainment
Feras Bugnah, along with Malob Aleyna colleagues Hosam al-Deraiwish and Khaled al-Rasheed, were reportedly detained on October 16, 2011, just six days after an episode of their show was posted on YouTube and viewed by hundreds of thousands. This particular episode highlighted the poverty in the Al-Jaroudiya region of Riyadh, the capital of Saudi Arabia. All three men were released on October 30 of that same year.

References

Sources
 "http://www.arabnews.com/feras-bugnah-puts-himself-other-people’s-shoes"

External links
 Feras Bugnah Personal Twitter Account
 Mal3ob3lena Twitter Account
 Mal3ob3lena YouTube Account

Living people
1987 births
Video bloggers
YouTube channels launched in 2009
Saudi Arabian YouTubers
People from Riyadh
Saudi Arabian prisoners and detainees
Arabic-language YouTube channels
Vlogs-related YouTube channels
YouTube vloggers